The 1963–64 season was Beşiktaş J.K.'s 45th official season, their 6th year in the Turkish First Football League and their 61st year in existence. They finished 2nd in the Turkish First Football League behind Fenerbahçe by a single point. They also competed in the Balkans Cup for the first time but were eliminated in the group stage.

First League

Balkans Cup

Beşiktaş took part in their first Balkans Cup tournament, but were eliminated in the group stage.

Group stage

External links
 Balkans Cup 1963-64

Beşiktaş J.K. seasons
Besiktas